The Athi River Super Bridge is the longest bridge on the Mombasa–Nairobi Standard Gauge Railway (SGR). It was built to carry a single-track railway line over the Athi River as it approaches the Kenyan capital city of Nairobi.

The bridge's length was necessary to avoid cutting through the town of Athi River. A direct crossing would have required the destruction of many residences or a major industrial zone. To avoid built-up areas, the Standard Gauge Railway turns to skirt the eastern side of the town. The Super Bridge crosses the meandering Athi River three times, running through undeveloped land in the river's flood plain.

Photos

References

Railway bridges in Kenya
Bridges completed in 2017
Rail infrastructure in Kenya